The Scout and Guide movement in the Cook Islands is served by two organisations
 The Girl Guides Cook Islands Association, member of the World Association of Girl Guides and Girl Scouts
 Cook Islands Boy Scout Association

References